FSSA may refer to: 

 Fellow of the Scottish Society of Arts, see Royal Scottish Society of Arts
 Frank Sinatra School of the Arts, New York
 Family & Social Services Administration, Indiana